Bruce Frayne (born 24 January 1958) is a retired Australian sprinter who specialized in the 200 and 400 metres. He was Australian Champion in the 200 metres 1980, 81, and 1983. He also won the 400 metres in 1984.
In 1981 he won Gold in the 4 × 400 relay at the Pacific Conference Games, and he won silver in the 200 metres.

He also competed at the Commonwealth Games in 1982 at Brisbane where he reached the 200 metre final where he finished 5th. And in the sprint relay team where they finished 4th in the final.

He competed in the individual distances at the 1983 World Championships and the 1984 Summer Olympics, reaching the semi-final on both occasions. At the 1983 World Championships he competed as well in both 4 × 100 metres relay and 4 × 400 metres relay, again without reaching the final.

In the 1984 Olympic 4 × 400 metres Frayne finished fourth with the Australian team. The team, consisting of Bruce Frayne, Darren Clark, Gary Minihan and Rick Mitchell, ran in a new Australian record time of 2:59.70 minutes. As of 2020, the record still stands.

At the 1986 Commonwealth Games he won a silver medal in the 4 x 400 metres relay.

His P.B. for the 200 was 20.59.
His P.B. for the 400 was 45.21.

2012 Olympian Henry Frayne is his nephew.

International competitions

References

External links

1958 births
Living people
Australian male sprinters
Athletes (track and field) at the 1982 Commonwealth Games
Athletes (track and field) at the 1986 Commonwealth Games
Athletes (track and field) at the 1984 Summer Olympics
Olympic athletes of Australia
Commonwealth Games silver medallists for Australia
Commonwealth Games medallists in athletics
Medallists at the 1986 Commonwealth Games